Leschke syndrome is a condition characterized by growth retardation and intellectual disability. The syndrome is named after German internist Erich Leschke.

Further symptoms may include diabetes mellitus, genital hypoplasia, and hyperthyroidism.

See also 
 Silver–Russell syndrome
 List of cutaneous conditions

References

External links
 

Genodermatoses
Syndromes